Although Germany has the technical capability to produce weapons of mass destruction (WMD), since World War II it has generally refrained from producing those weapons. However, Germany participates in the NATO nuclear weapons sharing arrangements and trains for delivering United States nuclear weapons. Officially, 20 US-nuclear weapons are stationed in Büchel, Germany. It could be more or fewer, but the exact number of the weapons is a state secret.

Germany is among the powers which possess the ability to create nuclear weapons, but has agreed not to do so under the Treaty on the Non-Proliferation of Nuclear Weapons and Two Plus Four Treaty. Along with most other industrial nations, Germany produces components that can be used for creating deadly agents, chemical weapons, and other WMD. Alongside other companies from the United Kingdom, the Netherlands, India, the United States, Belgium, Spain, and Brazil, German companies provided Iraq with precursors of chemical agents used by Iraq to engage in chemical warfare during the Iran–Iraq War.

History

World War I

One of the major combatants in World War I, Germany was the first to develop and use chemical weapons such as mustard gas and phosgene. These kinds of weapon were subsequently also employed by the Allies.

The use of chemical weapons in warfare during the Great War was allegedly in violation of clause IV.2 'Declaration concerning the Prohibition of the Use of Projectiles with the Sole Object to Spread Asphyxiating Poisonous Gases' of the 1899 Hague Declarations, and more explicitly in violation of the 1907 Hague Convention on Land Warfare, which explicitly forbade the use of "poison or poisoned weapons" in warfare.

World War II

During World War II, Germany conducted an unsuccessful project to develop nuclear weapons. German scientists also did research on other chemical weapons during the war, including human experimentation with mustard gas. The first nerve gas, tabun, was invented by the German researcher Gerhard Schrader in 1937.

During the war, Germany stockpiled tabun, sarin, and soman but refrained from their use on the battlefield. In total, Germany produced about 78,000 tons of chemical weapons. Delivery systems for the nerve agents included 105 mm and 150 mm artillery shells, a 250 kg bomb and a 150 mm rocket. Even when the Soviet army neared Berlin, Adolf Hitler decided not to use tabun in a last ditch effort against the Soviets. The use of tabun was opposed by Hitler's Minister of Armaments, Albert Speer, who, in 1943, brought IG Farben's nerve agent expert Otto Ambros to report to Hitler. He informed Hitler that the Allies had stopped publication of research into organophosphates (a type of organic compound that encompasses nerve agents) at the beginning of the war, that the essential nature of nerve gases had been published as early as the turn of the century, and that he believed that Allies could not have failed to produce agents like tabun. This was not in fact the case, but Hitler accepted Ambros's deduction, and Germany's tabun arsenal remained unused.

Cold War and beyond
As part of the accession negotiations of West Germany to the Western European Union at the London and Paris Conferences, the country was forbidden (by Protocol No III to the revised Treaty of Brussels of 23 October 1954) to possess nuclear, biological or chemical weapons. This was reiterated in domestic law by the Kriegswaffenkontrollgesetz (War Weapons Control Act). During the Cold War, nuclear weapons were deployed in Germany by both the United States (in West Germany) and the Soviet Union (in East Germany). Despite not being among the nuclear powers during the Cold War, Germany had a political and military interest in the balance of nuclear capability. In 1977, after the Soviet deployment of the new SS-20 IRBM, West German chancellor Helmut Schmidt expressed concern over the capability of NATO's nuclear forces compared to those of the Soviets. Later in the Cold War under the chancellorship of Helmut Kohl, the West German government expressed concern about the progress of the nuclear arms race. Particularly, they addressed the eagerness of Germany's NATO allies, the United States and United Kingdom, to seek restrictions on long-range strategic weapons while modernizing their short-range and tactical nuclear systems. Germany wanted to see such short range systems eliminated, because their major use was not deterrence but battlefield employment. Germany itself, straddling the division of the Eastern and Western blocs in Europe, was a likely battlefield in any escalation of the Cold War and battlefield use of nuclear weapons would be devastating to German territory.

In 1957 the European Atomic Energy Community (Euratom) was created to promote the use of nuclear energy in Europe. Under cover of the peaceful use of nuclear power, West Germany hoped to develop the basis of a nuclear weapons programme with France and Italy. The West German Chancellor Konrad Adenauer told his cabinet that he "wanted to achieve, through EURATOM, as quickly as possible, the chance of producing our own nuclear weapons". The idea was short-lived. In 1958 Charles De Gaulle became President of France, and Germany and Italy were excluded from the weapons project. Euratom continued as the European agency for the peaceful use of nuclear technology, falling under the institutions of the European Economic Community in 1967.

Germany ratified the Geneva Protocol on 25 April 1929, the Nuclear Non-Proliferation Treaty on 2 May 1975, the Biological Weapons Convention on 7 April 1983 and the Chemical Weapons Convention on 12 August 1994. These dates signify ratification by the Federal Republic of Germany (West Germany), during the division of Germany the NPT and the BWC were ratified separately by the German Democratic Republic (East Germany) (on 31 October 1969 and 28 November 1972, respectively).

Before German reunification in 1990, both West and East Germany ratified the Treaty on the Final Settlement with Respect to Germany. Germany reaffirmed its renunciation of the manufacture, possession, and control of nuclear, biological, and chemical weapons. In addition to banning a foreign military presence in the former East Germany, the treaty also banned nuclear weapons or nuclear weapon carriers to be stationed in the area, making it a permanent Nuclear-Weapon-Free Zone. The German military was allowed to possess conventional weapons systems with nonconventional capabilities, provided that they were outfitted for a purely conventional role.

The United States provides about 60 tactical B61 nuclear bombs for use by Germany under a NATO nuclear weapons sharing agreement. The bombs are stored at Büchel Air Base and in time of war would be delivered by Luftwaffe Panavia Tornado warplanes. As well as being a breach of the Protocols to the (revised) Treaty of Brussels (terminated in 2010), many countries believe this violates Articles I and II of the Nuclear Non-Proliferation Treaty (NPT), where Germany has committed:
"... not to receive the transfer from any transferor whatsoever of nuclear weapons or other nuclear explosive devices or of control over such weapons or explosive devices directly, or indirectly ... or otherwise acquire nuclear weapons or other nuclear explosive devices ...".

The U.S. insists its forces control the weapons and that no transfer of the nuclear bombs or control over them is intended "unless and until a decision were made to go to war, at which the [NPT] treaty would no longer be controlling", so there is no breach of the NPT. However German pilots and other staff practise handling and delivering the U.S. nuclear bombs. Even if the NATO argument is considered legally correct, such peacetime operations could arguably contravene both the objective and the spirit of the NPT.

In 2007, former German defence secretary Rupert Scholz stated that Germany should strive to become a nuclear power. In September 2007 the French president Nicolas Sarkozy offered Germany the opportunity to participate in control over the French nuclear arsenal.
Chancellor Merkel and foreign minister Steinmeier declined the offer however, stating that Germany "had no interest in possessing nuclear weapons". Due to concerns over Vladimir Putin's actions, Merkel reversed her position, stating to the German press, "As long as there are nuclear weapons in the world, we need to have these capabilities, as NATO says."

NATO member states, including Germany, decided not to sign the UN treaty on the Prohibition of Nuclear Weapons, a binding agreement for negotiations for the total elimination of nuclear weapons, supported by more than 120 nations.

German economist and politician Tobias Lindner called Germany's nuclear sharing agreement "an expensive, dangerous and antiquated symbolic contribution to have a say within NATO."

In October 2021, German Defense Minister Annegret Kramp-Karrenbauer had talked about the possibility of deploying nuclear weapons against Russia. She noted that nuclear weapons are a "means of deterrence."

In regards to the relationship with the United States, German Chancellor Olaf Scholz agrees with a longstanding agreement that allows American tactical nuclear weapons to be stored and manned on American bases in Germany. In November 2021 Rolf Mützenich claimed, that he wants to move NATO B61 nuclear bomb out of Germany.

See also
German nuclear weapon project
Nuclear sharing

References

External links
U.S. Nuclear Weapons in Europe

WMD
Weapons of mass destruction by country